Seiler is a surname. Notable people with the surname include:
Alexander Seiler I (born 1819), Swiss Hotel Pioneer
Hermann Seiler (born  1876) Swiss Hotel Pioneer & Politician
 Jack Seiler (born 1963), American politician and Mayor of Fort Lauderdale, Florida
 Kerim Seiler (born 1974), Swiss artist and architect
 Lewis Seiler (1890–1964), American film director
 Paul Seiler (1945–2001), American football player
 Reinhard Seiler (1909–1989), German Luftwaffe pilot
 Robert Eldridge Seiler (1912–1998), American judge on the Missouri Supreme Court
 Sebastian Seiler (1810–1890), German journalist
 Sonny Seiler (born 1933), American attorney and bulldog owner

See also 
 Sailer (disambiguation)
 Sayler
 Seyler
 Seiler Instrument & Mfg. Co.
 Seiler Pianofortefabrik GmbH

Occupational surnames
German-language surnames